Naku Penta Naku Taka (English: I Love You I Want You) is a 2014 Malayalam-language Indian film directed by Vayalar Madhavan Kutty and produced by Gokulam Gopalan. This is the first Malayalam film shot in Kenya. It stars Indrajith Sukumaran, Bhama, Murali Gopy and Shankar.

Plot
Naku Penta Naku Taka is a humorous film about a girl Subha, who dreams about marrying a person working in America, but ends up marrying a man named Vinay working in Kenya, thereby shattering her dreams. She didn't have any other choice, but to accompany her husband to Kenya. The incidents that happen in the life of the couple after they reach Kenya become the plot of the story.

Subha seems reluctant about the relationship at first, then after few incidents they go close to each other. They have a neighbor Indu from their home town who has an abusive husband Bhadran. One night at a party at Vinay's house, Bhadran crashes the party and kidnaps Vinay's housemaid Emma.  On the way the car gets into an accident and Emma dies. Incidents take a twist from there. According to Kenyan culture, if a person from their tribe is murdered they take the revenge by murdering the murderer's' family. After these incidents, Subha seemed physically disturbed.

Thus to distract Shubha from the current incidents, Vinay take Subha on a short vacation. Unfortunately on the way, their vehicle's tyre gets punctured. When they are trying to change the tyre, the tribes too come their way. Unfortunately, in self-defense Vinay shoots a member of tribe. From there again things go down for Vinay and Subha.

Cast
Indrajith Sukumaran as Vinay
Bhama as Shubha Vinay
Murali Gopy as Anton Kulasingam
Shanker as Iyyer
Anusree as Indu Bhadran
Pradeep Kottayam as  Sreedharan
Sasi Kalinga as Kartha
Sudheer Karamana as Bhadran
Sunil Sukhada as Karunan
Raymond Ofula as Kenyan Defence Minister 
Edi Gathegi as Kenyan Military Officer
Oliver Litondo as Vinays Bose
Brenda Wairimu as Tribal Leader 
 Sethu Lakshmi as airport passenger 
 Pradeep Chandran as Customs Officer

References

External links
 
 
 Naku Penta Naku Taka on OneIndia.in

2014 films
2010s Malayalam-language films
Indian comedy films
Films shot in Kenya